The 2022 Carmarthenshire County Council election took place on Thursday 5 May 2022 to elect 75 members to Carmarthenshire Council. On the same day, elections were held to the other 21 local authorities and to community councils in Wales as part of the 2022 Welsh local elections.

Plaid Cymru won a majority of seats for the first time, whilst losing their leader, Emlyn Dole.  Welsh Labour regained some ground in Carmarthenshire by winning seats in the Amman Valley and Llanelli constituency from Plaid Cymru. New Independent lost one seat overall and their leader, Jeff Edmunds and the Conservatives' only Councillor, Shahana Najmi, also lost her seat. 

Despite winning a majority of seats, Plaid Cymru formed a coalition with eight Independent Councillors.

Background 
Council elections in Wales were originally scheduled for May 2021, but were delayed to avoid a conflict with the 2021 Senedd election. The frequency of the elections was also increased from 4 years to five years to avoid future clashes, meaning (after 2022) the next council election is expected in 2027.

The number of councillors were increased by 1 after the Local Democracy and Boundary Commission for Wales recommended the change in a report in August 2019. Although there was an increase from 74 to 75 seats in the council, the number of wards were decreased to 51 from 58.

The Plaid Cymru group in conjunction with Independent group had been in control of the council since May 2015. Labour claimed to be confident of success, though had suffered a number of resignations from the party since the last election. Many former Labour members were standing in this election as New Independents.

Boundary changes 
In July 2021 Welsh Government accepted a number of ward change proposals by the Local Democracy and Boundary Commission for Wales, with slight modifications on Welsh language names for some wards. These are to take effect from the 2022 council election.  The changes gave a better parity of representation. Thirty-four wards remained unchanged. Of the other wards:

 Carmarthen Town North ward merges with Carmarthen Town South ward and is renamed "Carmarthen Town North and South", with total decrease in councillors from 4 to 3.
 Ammanford ward merges with Pontamman ward with a 2 councillor seat, and renamed "Ammanford".
 Tycroes community of Llanedi Ward merges with Llanedi community of Hendy Ward with 1 councillor, and renamed "Tycroes".
 Hendy community of Hendy ward becomes a ward of its self with 1 councillor.
 Brynea ward would have an increase from 1 to 2 councillors.
 Dafen ward merges with Felinfoel ward with a 2 councillor seat, and renamed "Dafen and Felinfoel".
 Bigyn ward would have an increase from 2 to 3 councillors.
 Tyisha ward merges with a part of Elli Ward (known as 'Lakefield' - Polling district TYI-B) with 2 councillors, and named "Tyisha".
 Elli ward loses area 'Lakefield' (Polling district TYI-B) and remains with 1 councillor.
 Kidwelly ward merges with St. Ishmael town of St. Ishmael ward with a 2 councillor seat, and renamed "Kidwelly and St. Ishmael".
 Llangyndeyrn ward merges with Llandyfaelog community of St. Ishmael ward with a 2 councillor seat, and renamed "Llangyndeyrn".
 Llansteffan ward merges with St. Clears ward with a 2 councillor seat, and renamed "St. Clears with Llansteffan".
 Trelech ward merges with Newchurch and Merthyr community of Cynwyl Elfed ward, remains with a 1 councillor seat, and named "Trelech".
 Cynwyl Elfed ward loses Newchurch and Merthyr community, remains with a 1 councillor seat, and named "Cynwyl Elfed".
 Cenarth ward merges with Llangeler ward with a 2 councillor seat, and renamed "Cenarth and Llangeler".
 Cilycwm ward merges with Cynwyl Gaeo and Llanycrwys communities of Cynwyl Gaeo ward, with 1 councillor seat, and named "Cilycwm".
 Manordeilo and Salem ward merges with Llansawel community of Cynwyl Gaeo ward, with 1 councillor seat, and named "Manordeilo and Salem".

Overview of results 
Plaid Cymru won 38 out of 75 seats to gain a majority on the council for the first time, despite the defeat of their leader, Emlyn Dole.

Ward results 
(* denotes sitting councillor before election).

Abergwili (1 Seat)

Ammanford (2 Seats) 

 
 
 

Evans was formerly councillor for the Pontamman ward.

Betws (1 Seat)

Bigyn (3 Seats) 

Michael Cranham was sitting Mayor of Llanelli and Independent town councillor.

Two Labour candidates tied for the third seat with Philip Thomas Warlow beating David Darkin to the third seat on the toss of a coin.

Sitting Councillors, Jeff Edmunds and Eryl Morgan, who were elected in 2017 as Labour Councillors but subsequently left Labour and formed their own political party.

Burry Port (2 Seats)

Bynea (2 Seats)

Carmarthen Town North and South  (3 Seats)

Carmarthen Town West (2 Seat)

Cenarth and Llangeler (2 Seats)

Cilycwm (1 Seat)

Cwarter Bach (1 Seat)

Cynwyl Elfed (1 Seat)

Dafen and Felinfoel (2 Seats)

Elli (1 Seat)

Garnant (1 Seat)

Glanamman (1 Seat)

Glanymor (2 Seats) 

Sean Rees had stood in Glanymor in 2017 as a Plaid Cymru candidate and missed out on being elected by a single vote. In 2022, standing as an independent candidate, he topped the poll with a 407 vote majority over the second-placed candidate.

That second seat was won by incumbent councillor, Louvain Roberts, who was elected as a Labour councillor in 2017 but left the Labour Party in 2019. At this election she stood as an Independent, retaining her seat. The other independent candidate, Amanda Carter, failed to be elected.

Glyn (1 Seat)

Gorslas (2 Seats)

Hendy (1 Seat)

Hengoed (2 Seats)

Kidwelly and St. Ishmael (2 Seats) 

Gilasbey had been the councillor for the former Kidwelly ward.

Laugharne Township (1 Seat)

Llanboidy (1 Seat)

Llanddarog (1 Seat)

Llandeilo (1 Seat)

Llandovery (1 Seat)

Llandybie (2 Seat)

Llanegwad (1 Seat)

Llanfihangel Aberbythych (1 Seat)

Llanfihangel-ar-Arth (1 Seat)

Llangadog (1 Seat)

Llangennech (2 Seats)

Llangunnor (1 Seat)

Llangyndeyrn (2 Seats)

Llannon (2 Seats)

Llanybydder (1 Seat)

Lliedi (2 Seats) 

Rob James, leader of the Labour Group on Carmarthenshire County Council, was re-elected.

The other incumbent Councillor, Shahana Najmi, had been elected in 2017 as a Labour Councillor, was one of several Labour Councillors in Llanelli to leave the Labour Party in 2019. Initially sitting as an Independent Councillor, Najmi joined the Conservative Party in 2021 but was not re-elected as a Conservative in Lliedi in 2022.

Independent candidate, Heather Peters, was initially selected as a Labour Party candidate in this ward but in March 2022 announced she was standing for the New Independent Party, the Party formed out of many of those who left the Labour Party in 2019, instead.

The other Independent candidate, Sharon Burdess, also stood for the New Independent Party having failed to secure a Labour Party nomination at these elections.

Llwynhendy (2 Seats)

Manordeilo and Salem (1 Seat)

Pembrey (2 Seats)

Penygroes (1 Seat)

Pontyberem (1 Seat)

Saron (2 Seats)

St. Clears and Llansteffan (2 Seats)

Swiss Valley (1 Seat)

Trelech (1 Seat)

Trimsaran (1 Seat)

Tycroes (1 Seat)

Tyisha (2 Seat)

Whitland (1 Seat)

References

Carmarthenshire
Carmarthenshire County Council elections
21st century in Carmarthenshire